Jorge Alejandro Zárate Careaga (born 20 January 1992) is a Mexican professional footballer who plays as a midfielder.

Career

Youth
Zárate was born in San Luis Potosí, and joined Pubelas youth academy in 2008. He continued through Puebla's Youth Academy successfully going through U-17 and U-20. Until finally reaching the first team, José Luis Sánchez Solá being the coach promoting Zárate to first team. Zárate also later forming part of Chiapas F.C. Youth Academy in 2012 and Morelia Youth Academy in 2013.

Puebla
On Sunday April 11, 2010 Zárate made his debut with the top club against Indios in a 2–1 loss.

Morelia
On May 31, 2013 Morelia signed Zárate for an undisclosed amount. Zárate made his debut on October 4, 2014, against Chiapas F.C. ending in a 2–1 win only playing the last 5 mins Zarate returned from loan at Querétaro and Zarate scored in a 1–1 tie with club America.

Honours
Morelia
Copa MX: Apertura 2013
Supercopa MX: 2014

References

1992 births
Living people
Club Puebla players
Lobos BUAP footballers
Chiapas F.C. footballers
Atlético Morelia players
Atlas F.C. footballers
Liga MX players
Footballers from San Luis Potosí
Mexican footballers
Association football midfielders